The 2007 Vegas Grand Prix was the first round of the 2007 Champ Car World Series Season, held on April 8 on the streets of Las Vegas, Nevada.

Qualifying results

 Tracy awarded 2nd on the starting grid for gaining provisional pole position.

Grid

Race
The race was a fresh start for the Champ Car World Series. With a new car (Panoz DP01), new rules, including timed races and staggered starts, new teams like Pacific Coast Motorsports, a different season opener on a new track, and an eventual return to ABC/ESPN later in the year, all were the big stories of the day. The race would be one of survival of the fittest as many drivers were taken out by either crashes or mechanical failures. Newman/Haas/Lanigan Racing would not have a good day as 3-time champion Sébastien Bourdais was hampered by numerous tire problems and rookie Graham Rahal was taken out on the first lap. Will Power had the dominant car all day long, only being challenged consistently by Paul Tracy, who many saw as the man to unseat Bourdais as the face of Champ Car. In the end, the race would all come down to fuel mileage. Tracy's car struggled with taking a full load of fuel preventing him from snapping his winless streak. Will Power outlasted the field to take his first career victory, which was also the first Champ Car victory by an Australian, in a dominant fashion.

Caution flags

Notes

 New Race Lap Record: Will Power: 1:19.934
 New Race Record: Will Power: 1:45:13.637 (68 Laps)
This was not only Will Power's first victory, but also the first victory for an Australian in Champ Car.
The win was also the first for Team Australia owner Derrick Walker since 1999.

Attendance
Attendance at the inaugural 2007 event was estimated to be 40,000 fans on race day. This surpassed the number of seats available on the course's temporary grandstands facilitating an expansion for the 2008 season.

Future of the Race
This was the third race for Champ Car in Las Vegas, but the only one held on a downtown street course. Two oval Grands Prix had taken place at Las Vegas Motor Speedway: the 2004 Bridgestone 400 and the 2005 Hurricane Relief 400. The planned 2008 race was removed from the calendar due to Champ Car's merge with the Indy Racing League (IRL).

IRL returned to Las Vegas in 2011, however the return was at Las Vegas Motor Speedway, rather than to a downtown street course.

References

External links
 Full Weekend Times & Results
 Race Box Score

Las Vegas
Las Vegas Grand Prix
Las Vegas Grand Prix, 2007